Bojer's skink (Gongylomorphus bojerii, formerly Scelotes bojeri) is a small species of skink, a lizard in the family Scincidae. The species is endemic to Mauritius including some of its offshore islands.

Etymology
Both the specific name, bojerii, and the common name, Bojer's skink, are in honor of Czech naturalist Wenceslas Bojer.

Description
It has five digits on each extremity.

Geographic range
Bojer's skink occurs in patches of the Black River Gorges National Park and on some off-shore islands of Mauritius including Ilot Vacoas, Round Island, Serpent Island, Ilot Gabriel, Pigeon Rock, Flat Island, Gunner's Quoin, Ile aux Aigrettes, and Ile de la Passe.

Habitat

Behavior
G. bojerii is diurnal and terrestrial.

Reproduction
The mode of reproduction of G. bojerii is unknown.

Threats
The Asian house shrew (Suncus murinus) has aided in the decline of G. bojerii. Thanks to the efforts of the Mauritian Wildlife Foundation, this invasive species of mammal was eradicated from the habitat of Bojer's skink. Also, captive breeding and reintroduction efforts at the Gerald Durrell Endemic Wildlife Sanctuary have helped to increase the population of G. bojerii.

References

Further reading
Boulenger GA (1887). Catalogue of the Lizards in the British Museum (Natural History). Second Edition. Volume III. Lactertidæ, Gerrosauridæ, Scincidæ, Anelytropidæ, Dibamidæ, Chamæleontidæ. London: Trustees of the British Museum (Natural History). (Taylor and Francis, printers). xii + 575 pp. + Plates I-XL. (Scelotes bojeri, p. 409).
Cheke, Anthony; Hume, Julian (2008). Lost Land of the Dodo: An Ecological History of Mauritius, Réunion and Rodrigues. London: T & AD Poyser. 480 pp. .
Desjardins J (1831). "Sur trois espèces de Lézard du genre Scinque, qui habitent l'ile Maurice (Ile-de-France)". Annales des Sciences Naturelles, Paris 22: 292–299. (Scincus bojerii, new species, pp. 296–298). (in French).
Greer AE (1970). "The Systematics and Evolution of the Subsaharan Africa, Seychelles, and Mauritius Scin[c]ine Scin[c]id Lizards". Bulletin of the Museum of Comparative Zoology, Harvard University 140 (1): 1-24.

External links
Genetics of Gongylomorphus skinks.

Gongylomorphus
Reptiles of Mauritius
Reptiles described in 1831
Taxa named by Julien Desjardins